FOB Robinson was a Forward Operating Base in Helmand Province, Afghanistan. It was located next to the Helmand River, near the town of Sangin. It was called FOB Wolf and was built by the 3/124th Infantry American Security Force.

It was handed over to British 3rd Battalion, Parachute Regiment on 2 June 2006.

According to the U.S. Department of Defense, FOB Robinson got its name from an American soldier killed in action in Sangin District, Staff Sergeant Christopher L. Robinson, 36, of Brandon, Mississippi.

FOB Robinson was a forward mounting base for US Special Forces who had several A Teams located next to the British half of the camp.

Units
 3/124th Infantry American Security Force from March until 2 June 2006.
 Possibly a troop of 39th Regiment Royal Artillery with the M270 Multiple Launch Rocket System during Op Herrick's 6, 7, 8, 9, 10 and 13.
 OP H 4 (May – November 2006)
 3rd Battalion, Parachute Regiment (3 PARA) from 2 June 2006 until unknown.
 OP H 5 (Dec 2006 – March 2007)
 Whiskey Company, 45 Commando
 OP H 7 (October 2007 - April 2008)
 Echo Company, 40 Commando
 Support from Sniper Section, 1st Battalion, Coldstream Guards during November.
 OP H 8 (April 2008 – October 2008)
 D Company, 2 PARA

See also
 Battle of Lashkagar
 List of Afghan Armed Forces installations
 List of ISAF installations in Afghanistan

Notes

References 

Military installations of Afghanistan
Military installations of the United States in Afghanistan
Military bases of the United Kingdom in Afghanistan
Military installations of Denmark
Military installations of the United Arab Emirates